I to Sky is the second and final album from Irish indie rock band JJ72, released on Lakota Records in 2002, to much critical acclaim, but lesser commercial success.

Track listing
 "Nameless" – 2:26
 "Formulae" – 4:13
 "I Saw a Prayer" – 4:59
 "Serpent Sky" – 3:18
 "Always and Forever" – 4:30
 "Brother Sleep" – 4:20
 "Sinking" – 7:15
 "7th Wave" – 4:00
 "Half Three" – 4:27
 "Glimmer" – 4:47
 "City" – 5:17
 "Oíche Mhaith" – 4:34

Personnel

JJ72
 Mark Greaney - vocals, guitar, piano, songwriting 
 Hilary Woods - bass, vocals
 Fergal Matthews - drums, percussion

2002 albums
JJ72 albums
Albums produced by Flood (producer)